This is the list of programmes broadcast on the British television channel, Challenge.

Programming

Current programming made by Challenge

Former programming made by Challenge

Current programming originally shown by other broadcasters

Former programming originally shown by other broadcasters

Former programming shown on The Family Channel

External links

Challenge.co.uk
.

.
.

British television-related lists
Lists of television series by network